Fontana is a city in south central Miami County, Kansas, United States, and is part of the Kansas City metropolitan area.  As of the 2020 census, the population of the city was 210.  The name Fontana comes from the French word fontaine, meaning fountain or a spring-like water source. It was given to the small city from a spring near the town site. Fontana's history as a community dates back to the early 19th century, however incorporation did not occur until 1889.

History 
Part of this property would eventually become the townsite and rural community of Fontana. J.B. Grinnell purchased  of the property in 1869, and put Fontana in the center near a railroad right of way. The city was incorporated in 1889.

Geography

Demographics

2010 census
As of the census of 2010, there were 224 people, 72 households, and 55 families residing in the city. The racial makeup of the city was 92.9% White, 0.4% African American, 0.4% Native American, 0.4% Asian, 2.7% from other races, and 3.1% from two or more races. Hispanic or Latino of any race were 6.7% of the population.

There were 72 households, of which 48.6% had children under the age of 18 living with them, 56.9% were married couples living together, 13.9% had a female householder with no husband present, 5.6% had a male householder with no wife present, and 23.6% were non-families. 19.4% of all households were made up of individuals, and 9.8% had someone living alone who was 65 years of age or older. The average household size was 3.11 and the average family size was 3.42.

The median age in the city was 32.2 years. 31.7% of residents were under the age of 18; 11.6% were between the ages of 18 and 24; 27.2% were from 25 to 44; 21.9% were from 45 to 64; and 7.6% were 65 years of age or older. The gender makeup of the city was 50.9% male and 49.1% female.

2000 census
As of the census of 2000, there were 149 people, 61 households, and 46 families residing in the city. The racial makeup of the city was 97.32% White, 0.67% Native American, 0.67% from other races, and 1.34% from two or more races. Hispanic or Latino of any race were 2.01% of the population.

There were 61 households, out of which 21.3% had children under the age of 18 living with them, 65.6% were married couples living together, 9.8% had a female householder with no husband present, and 23.0% were non-families. 18.0% of all households were made up of individuals, and 13.1% had someone living alone who was 65 years of age or older. The average household size was 2.44 and the average family size was 2.72.

In the city, the population was spread out, with 20.8% under the age of 18, 10.7% from 18 to 24, 22.1% from 25 to 44, 28.2% from 45 to 64, and 18.1% who were 65 years of age or older. The median age was 43 years. For every 100 females, there were 79.5 males. For every 100 females age 18 and over, there were 90.3 males.

The median income for a household in the city was $29,375, and the median income for a family was $32,083. Males had a median income of $26,875 versus $13,000 for females. The per capita income for the city was $13,484. There were 5.4% of families and 12.7% of the population living below the poverty line, including 7.4% of under eighteens and 22.2% of those over 64.

Economy

With a farm-based economy, the Fontana Co-Op is of great importance to the area farmers.

Education
The community is served by Prairie View USD 362 public school district. Students from grades 6–12 attend Prairie View Middle School or Prairie View High School in La Cygne, Kansas.

Previously, Fontana Elementary was located in Fontana, having a total enrollment of approximately 100 students from kindergarten through 5th grades.  In approximately 2011, the Prairie View School Board expressed an interest in replacing or remodeling Fontana Elementary. Various proposals were made, including one to build a new school close to Prairie View Middle School, but the Board eventually settled on a decision to expand nearby Parker Elementary, which was part of Prairie View along with Fontana. The school ceased operations in May 2014, with the end of the school year, and all the students were moved to Parker Elementary. The school building has since been sold to private owners.

References

Further reading

External links

 Fontana, Kansas
 Fontana – Directory of Public Officials
 Fontana city map, KDOT

Cities in Kansas
Cities in Miami County, Kansas
1889 establishments in Kansas
Populated places established in 1889